Mader may refer to:

 Mader, the German name for Modrava, a village in the Czech Republic
 Mäder, a town in Austria
 Mader (surname), a German family name

See also
 Madder (disambiguation)